The Scott Bar Mountains are a mountain range in Siskiyou County, California. The area is named after gold miner John W. Scott who found a large gold nugget at what is now the town of Scott Bar.

References 

Mountain ranges of Northern California
Mountain ranges of Siskiyou County, California